Qadariyyah, also Qadarites or Kadarites, from , meaning "power"); was originally a derogatory term designating early Islamic theologians who rejected the concept of predestination in Islam, qadr, and asserted that humans possess absolute free will, making them responsible for their actions, justifying divine punishment and absolving God of responsibility for evil in the world. Some of their doctrines were later adopted by the Mu'tazilis and rejected by the Ash'aris. They argued that evil actions of human beings could not be decreed by God, as they would have to be if there was no free will and all events in the universe were determined by God.

Qadariyyah was one of the first philosophical schools in Islam. The earliest document associated with the movement is the pseudoepigraphical text Risala attributed to Hasan al-Basri, which was composed between 75 AH/694 CE and 80/699, though debates about free will in Islam probably predate this text. According to Sunni sources, the Qadariyah were censured by Muhammad himself by being compared to Zoroastrians, who likewise deny predestination.

Sources
The medieval sources upon which information about the Qadariya is based include Risālat al-qadar ilā ʿAbd al-Malik (Epistle to ʿAbd al-Malik against the Predestinarians) which is incorrectly ascribed to Hasan al-Basri; anti-Qadari letters by Hasan ibn Muhammad ibn al-Hanafiyyah and Caliph Umar II; the work of the 9th-century Islamic scholar Khushaysh; the list of Qadarites by Ibn Qutayba, Ibn Hajar, al-Suyuti, Ibn al-Murtada and al-Dhahabi; scattered references to the Qadariya in the work of al-Tabari; and counter-Qadari polemics in the standard hadith collections of Sahih Muslim.

In Sunan Abu Dawood, it is narrated Abdullah ibn Umar that the Prophet said, "The Qadariyyah are the Magians of this community. If they are ill, do not pay a sick visit to them, and if they die, do not attend their funerals." 

Another report states "To every Ummah there is a magian and the magian of this ummah are those who reject the Qadr. If anyone amongst them dies, do not attend their funeral, and if anyone amongst them becomes sick don’t visit them and they are Shia-tul Dajjal and it is the right of God to join them with the Dajjal.” (Sunan Abu Dawoud 4072)

See also
 Mu'tazili
 Ma'bad al-Juhani
Jabariyah, a contrasting Islamic school of thought

References

Bibliography
 Islamic Philosophy A-Z, Peter S. Groff and Oliver Leaman. Edinburgh: Edinburgh University Press, 2007. .
 An Introduction to Islam, David Waines, Cambridge, New York: Cambridge University Press, 2003. .
 

7th-century Islam
Islamic philosophical schools
Free will
Islamic branches